The Twentieth Amendment of the Constitution Act 2001 is an amendment to the Constitution of Ireland which provided constitutional recognition of local government and required that local government elections occur at least once in every five years. It was approved by referendum on 11 June 1999 and signed into law on 23 June of the same year. The referendum was held the same day as the local and European Parliament elections.

Background
The structure of local government in Ireland dates back to the Local Government (Ireland) Act 1898, subject to amendments since then. There was no reference to local government in the Constitution as adopted in 1937. Local elections were held at irregular intervals: the local elections held previous to the adoption of the Amendment were in 1991, 1985 and 1979. Constitutional recognition of local government was proposed by the All-Party Committee on the Constitution, including a requirement to hold regular election.

Changes to the text
Insertion of a new Article:

Oireachtas debate
The Amendment was sponsored by the Minister for the Environment and Local Government and was proposed in the Dáil on 11 May 1999 by Minister of State Dan Wallace on behalf of the Fianna Fáil–Progressive Democrats coalition government led by Taoiseach Bertie Ahern. It was passed final stages in the Dáil on 12 May where it was opposed by opposition parties Fine Gael, the Labour Party, the Green Party, the Socialist Party and Independent Tony Gregory. Their opposition was to elements of the drafting rather than the principle of constitutional recognition of local government. It passed final stages in the Seanad on the same day, and proceeded to a referendum on 11 June 1999.

Campaign
A Referendum Commission was established by Minister for the Environment and Local Government Noel Dempsey. At the time, its role included setting out the arguments for and against the proposal.

Result

Note: For this referendum, the constituencies used were each county and city, which were deemed to be constituencies for the purpose of the poll. Usually in Irish referendums the general election constituencies are used.

References

External links
 Oireachtas Debates: Twentieth Amendment of the Constitution (No. 2) Bill 1999
 Irish Statute Book:
 Twentieth Amendment of the Constitution Act 1999
 Constitution of Ireland

1999 in Irish law
1999 in Irish politics
1999 referendums
20
Local government in the Republic of Ireland
20
June 1999 events in Europe
Amendment, 20